The Ministry of Works and Housing (MWH) is tasked with the conceptualization and classification of policies and programs for the systematic growth of the country's infrastructure. The offices of the Ministry is located in Accra.

Core Functions 
The functions of the Ministry are to pioneer and develop policies to meet the needs and expectations of the people in the country. The Ministry works collaboratively with the National Development Planning Commission to serve as a check on the performance of the sector. As part of its functions, the Ministry provides assistance in the form of training and research works in productions and endorse the use of local building materials.

Departments & Agencies 
These are the departments and agencies that work collaboratively with the Ministry:

Works Sector Agencies:
        Hydro-logical Services Department (HSD)
        Public Works Department (PWD)
        Architectural and Engineering Services Limited (AESL)
        Engineers Council
Housing Sector Agencies:
       Rent Control Department (RCD)
       Department of Rural Housing (DRH)
       Public Servants’ Housing Loans Scheme Board (PSHLSB)
       Architects Registration Council (ARC)
       Tema Development Corporation (TDC)
       State Housing Company (SHC)

Further reading 
Ministry of Works and Housing (Directorates)

See also 
Water supply and sanitation in Ghana

References 

Politics of Ghana
Works and Housing
Ministries and Agencies of State of Ghana